TheaterWeek was a favorite magazine among theater artists and theater lovers. It covered Broadway, off-Broadway, regional, and educational theater with articles that included profiles of actors, directors, designers and behind-the-scenes looks at particular shows. John Harris edited the magazine during its heyday, and such columnists as Peter Filichia, Alexis Greene, Ken Mandelbaum, Charles Marowitz, Davi Napoleon, Leslie (Hoban) Blake, and Michael Riedel were featured.

The magazine was said to falter from financial mismanagement when after more than twenty years of publishing, it folded. 
  
Other magazines, such as InTheater, and contemporary internet publications, such as TheaterMania.com and Broadway.com, were influenced by TheaterWeek and used some of the same writers.

References 
 Article about publisher Charles Ortleb 
 Obituary for the founder of TheaterWeek, Playbill

External links 
 TheaterWeek article by Michael Buckley
 TheaterWeek article by Michael Goldstein
 Article by Ken Mandelbaum for TheaterWeek  
 Article by Michael Kantor from TheaterWeek 
 Article by Davi Napoleon reprinted in The Faster Times that originally appeared in TheaterWeek

Defunct magazines published in the United States
Magazines established in 1987
Magazines disestablished in 1996
Magazines published in New York City
Theatre magazines
Weekly magazines published in the United States
Entertainment magazines published in the United States